Spitzbergen usually refers to Svalbard archipelago. For related topics see also Svalbard (disambiguation).

It can also refer to:

Spitsbergen, the largest island of the Svalbard
Montes Spitzbergen, a solitary mountain chain in the eastern Mare Imbrium of the Moon
The Spitzbergen Current, a current that runs poleward just west of Spitsbergen
A fictional organisation in episodes of No Guns Life
Hunters of Spitzbergen, a wildlife documentary
The Spitzbergen Raid
Spitzbergen ice core
Spitzbergen Mining and Exploration Syndicate